Tarrywile Park is a large municipal park in the city of Danbury, Connecticut. It also includes the Tarrywile Mansion, probably the finest Shingle Style house in the city. The house and its  property, including a gatehouse, carriagehouse, and greenhouse, was listed on the National Register of Historic Places in 1988. The park also includes Hearthstone Castle, an 1895 castle-like summer house that is in poor condition.

The park has a variety of trails, and is open for hiking, picnicking, and other outdoor activities.  The mansion can be toured by appointment, and is rentable for private functions.

See also
National Register of Historic Places listings in Fairfield County, Connecticut

References

External links

Buildings and structures in Danbury, Connecticut
Shingle Style houses
Houses completed in 1895
Houses in Fairfield County, Connecticut
Tourist attractions in Danbury, Connecticut
Parks in Fairfield County, Connecticut
National Register of Historic Places in Fairfield County, Connecticut
Parks on the National Register of Historic Places in Connecticut
Shingle Style architecture in Connecticut